The 1994 Proton Cars World Matchplay was the inaugural staging of the World Matchplay darts tournament, and was held in the Empress Ballroom at the Winter Gardens, Blackpool between 1–8 August 1994.

This was the first World Matchplay tournament to be held at Winter Gardens, and was sponsored by Malaysian automaker Proton. The tournament was won by Larry Butler, who became the first, and so far only American to win a PDC televised title.

Prize money
The prize fund was £42,400.

Seeds
 Dennis Priestley
 Peter Evison
 Bob Anderson
 Steve Brown
 Rod Harrington
 Sean Downs
 Cliff Lazarenko
 Kevin Spiolek

Results

Third place playoff (best of 21 legs)
 (5) Rod Harrington 11–9 Shayne Burgess

References

World Matchplay (darts)
World Matchplay Darts